Helmi may refer to:

Helmi (given name)
Helmi (surname)
Helmi Technologies, previously Visualway Design, designers of web-based applications and sites
Helmi stream, stellar stream
Helmi Sport, Lebanese football club
183635 Helmi, minor planet

See also

Helmy (disambiguation)